Joseph A. Brown (February 10, 1903January 16, 1963) was a Michigan politician.

Education
Brown graduated from a public school in Pittsburgh, Pennsylvania. Brown earned a Bachelors of Arts degree from Virginia Union College and a Bachelor of Laws degree from the University of Detroit.

Career
Brown was a lawyer. On November 5, 1946, Brown was elected to the Michigan Senate where he represented the 2nd district from 1947 to 1948. In 1948, Brown lost the Democratic primary for the same position. Also in 1948, Brown was a delegate to Democratic National Convention from Michigan.

Personal life and death
Brown was born on February 10, 1903, in Knoxville, Tennessee. He was of African ancestry. 

Brown married Lucille Nuttall in 1933. Brown was a member of the Elks and was a Freemason. He was a Baptist. 

Brown died on January 16, 1963.

References

1903 births
1963 deaths
American Freemasons
Baptists from Michigan
20th-century Baptists
Michigan lawyers
African-American lawyers
Politicians from Knoxville, Tennessee
African-American state legislators in Michigan
Democratic Party Michigan state senators
20th-century American politicians
20th-century American lawyers
20th-century African-American politicians
African-American men in politics